The Nabataean script is an abjad (consonantal alphabet) that was used to write Nabataean Aramaic and Nabataean Arabic from the second century BC onwards. Important inscriptions are found in Petra (now in Jordan), the Sinai Peninsula (now part of Egypt), and other archaeological sites including Abdah (in Palestine) and Mada'in Saleh in Saudi Arabia.

History
The alphabet is descended from the Aramaic alphabet.  In turn, a cursive form of Nabataean developed into the Arabic alphabet from the 4th century, which is why Nabataean's letterforms are intermediate between the more northerly Semitic scripts (such as the Aramaic-derived Hebrew) and those of Arabic.

Comparison with related scripts
As compared to other Aramaic-derived scripts, Nabataean developed more loops and ligatures, likely to increase speed of writing. The ligatures seem to have not been standardized and varied across places and time. There were no spaces between words. Numerals in Nabataean script were built from characters of 1, 2, 3, 4, 5, 10, 20, and 100.

 Note that the Syriac and Arabic alphabets are always cursive and that some of their letters look different in medial or initial position.
 See Aramaic alphabet § Letters for a more detailed comparison of letterforms.

Unicode

The Nabataean alphabet (U+10880–U+108AF) was added to the Unicode Standard in June 2014 with the release of version 7.0.

See also
 Ancient North Arabian script
 Ancient South Arabian script
 Nabataean Aramaic
 Nabataean Arabic

References

External links
The Nabataean script: a bridge between the Aramaic and Arabic alphabets.

Abjad writing systems
Nabataea
Semitic writing systems
Obsolete writing systems
Right-to-left writing systems
Nabataean script